The 2019 Atlanta United 2 season is the team's second year of existence, their second season in the USL which is now rebranded as the USL Championship, the second tier of the American soccer pyramid. This is the first season they will play their home matches at Fifth Third Bank Stadium in Kennesaw, Georgia.

Players

As of September 20, 2019.
The squad of Atlanta United 2 will be composed of an unrestricted number of first-team players on loan to the reserve team, players signed to ATLUTD2, and Atlanta United Academy players. Academy players who appear in matches with ATLUTD2 will retain their college eligibility.

Player movement

In

Out

Academy Leaves

Competitions

Friendlies

USL Championship

Standings

Results summary

Results by matchday

Matches

Statistics

Top scorers

Appearances and goals
 
Numbers after plus-sign(+) denote appearances as a substitute.

|-
|colspan="4"|Players who have played for Atlanta United 2 this season but have left the club:

|-
|}

References

2019 USL Championship season
American soccer clubs 2019 season
Atlanta United 2
Atlanta United 2 seasons